The Wandbühl is a mountain, and the fourth highest peak in the Swabian Jura in southern Germany. It lies north of the municipality of Wehingen in the state of Baden-Württemberg and is the southernmost summit of a mountain chain that includes the Montschenloch, Rainen and Bol. The Wandbühl is part of the so-called Region of the 10 Thousanders, as well as the Großer Heuberg.

References

External links 
 Walking description for the region

One-thousanders of Germany
Mountains and hills of Baden-Württemberg
Mountains and hills of the Swabian Jura
Tuttlingen